"The Way I Am" is a song by American singer-songwriter Charlie Puth. It was sent to US contemporary hit radio through Atlantic Records on July 24, 2018, as the fifth and final single from his second studio album, Voicenotes. It was initially released as the second promotional single from the album on May 3, 2018. Puth solely produced the song and wrote it alongside Jacob Kasher Hindlin.

Background

The song deals with Puth's reaction to his sudden fame, specifically his insecurities and anxieties. He has identified the song as his most personal on the album. The content of the song was so personal in fact that Puth "was almost crying while writing it because it was so overwhelming."

In an interview with Genius, Puth explained the meaning behind the song, saying: "I was known for who I was dating more than my music. People were forgetting that I was actually a singer. And that was not good and multiple people told me that wasn't good. I worked too hard to have that reputation. So I just like a slight steer to the left and brought it back to the music. I honestly feel better mentally than I ever have in my life."

Composition
"The Way I Am" is an upbeat pop song in which Puth addresses on his self-acceptance. Described as an "introspective, autobiographical track", it heavily features "a plugging electric guitar riff" throughout, with "Puth's vocals syncing up to the instrumental during the verses".

Music video
Directed by Colin Tilley, the music video was released on July 9, 2018. It features Puth wandering from one room to another, interspersed between flashbacks of a house party that took place the night before and shots of him sitting alone on the roof of the house, as partygoers drink and dance past him in fast-motion. Throughout the video, he locks eyes with a brunette woman (acted by Trew Mullen); they come face to face and exchange smirks as the party comes to an end. Salvatore Maicki of The Fader regarded the video as "a nice aesthetic throwback to the late 90s", while PopSugar's Mekishana Pierre opined that Puth's character bears a resemblance to My So-Called Lifes Jordan Catalano.

Live performances
On June 22, 2018, Puth made the first televised performance of "The Way I Am" at the 2018 Radio Disney Music Awards. On July 17, he performed the song during his television appearances on The Tonight Show Starring Jimmy Fallon, as well as the Citi Concert Series on Today three days later.

Track listing

Credits and personnel
Recording and management
 Published by Charlie Puth Music Publishing/Artist 101 Publishing Group (BMI) admin. by Warner Chappell; Rap Kingpin Music/Prescription Songs (ASCAP)

Personnel
Credits adapted from the liner notes of Voicenotes.

 Charlie Puth – vocals, songwriting, production, recording
 Jacob Kasher – songwriting
 Jan Ozveren – guitar

Charts

Weekly charts

Year-end charts

Certifications

Release history

Notes

References

External links
 

2018 singles
2018 songs
Charlie Puth songs
Songs written by Charlie Puth
Music videos directed by Colin Tilley
Atlantic Records singles
Pop ballads
Songs written by Jacob Kasher